Takht Rural District is a rural district (dehestan) in the Takht District of Bandar Abbas County, Hormozgan Province, Iran. At the 2006 census, its population was 6,562, in 1,524 families.  The rural district has 19 villages.

References 

Rural Districts of Hormozgan Province
Bandar Abbas County